Clarice Mukinda is an Angolan politician.

Mukinda is a member of the National Assembly of Angola. Mukinda was elected in 2017.

Mukinda is in the National Union for the Total Independence of Angola.

References

Living people
21st-century Angolan women politicians
21st-century Angolan politicians
Members of the National Assembly (Angola)
UNITA politicians
Year of birth missing (living people)